Two Guys from Texas is a 1948 American comedy musical western film directed by David Butler, and starring Dennis Morgan, Jack Carson and Dorothy Malone. The film was written by Allen Boretz and I.A.L. Diamond, produced by Alex Gottlieb, and released by Warner Bros. Pictures on September 4, 1948. This was a follow-up to the 1946 film Two Guys from Milwaukee, also starring Morgan and Carson, which in turn was an attempt to capture some of the appeal of Paramount's Bing Crosby and Bob Hope Road pictures.

Plot
Song-and-dance men Steve Carroll and Danny Foster walk to a Texas dude ranch after their car runs out of gas. The team's friend, singer Maggie Reed, gets the boys a job. With their auto stolen, the two settle into ranch life. While Danny consults with Dr. Straeger to conquer his fear of animals, Steve courts ranch owner Joan Winston. When their stolen car is used in a robbery, the duo must then find the real culprits.

This proves difficult, because the town sheriff, Tex Bennett is Carroll's rival in love; and he is delighted to find an excuse to jail them both. Luckily, the true bandits press their luck by attempting to hold up the box office at the town rodeo. Carroll captures them single-handed clearing the team. Foster is trapped atop a bucking bronco and manages to stay on, thus conquering his fear of animals.

An overweight American Indian woman has been tugging at Foster's arm throughout the film. Foster assumes she is in love with him, but she only wants to introduce him to her beautiful daughter. Foster happily accepts.

Cast
 Dennis Morgan as Steve Carroll
 Jack Carson as Danny Foster
 Dorothy Malone as Joan Winston
 Penny Edwards as Maggie Reed
 Forrest Tucker as 'Tex' Bennett
 Joan Rudolph as Mrs. Karen Walkers
 Fred Clark as Dr. Jack Straeger
 Gerald Mohr as Link Jessup
 John Alvin as Jim Crocker
 Andrew Tombes as The Texan
 Monte Blue as Pete Nash
 The Philharmonica Trio as Specialty Act

Petra Silva as large American Indian woman.

Bugs Bunny cameo appearance 
The film is perhaps best remembered today for featuring an animated cameo appearance of cartoon character Bugs Bunny, voiced by Mel Blanc.  Friz Freleng, Warner's leading animation director, was assigned to direct the special animated dream sequence, in which Bugs gives some advice to a caricatured Jack Carson.

Bugs would later have a similar cameo in 1949's My Dream Is Yours, which also starred Jack Carson. Bugs Bunny would later appear at the ending of the 1972 Barbra Streisand film What's Up, Doc?.

Production
The film cost an estimated $2 million.

Film connections 
Animation historians have noted the similarities between the animated dream sequence in this film and the Looney Tunes cartoon Swooner Crooner (1944). The latter, directed by Friz Freleng's colleague Frank Tashlin, concerned Porky Pig trying to reacquire the female chickens of his farm from a Frank Sinatra-esque rooster, who is driving the chicks away from the farm.

The same year Two Guys from Texas was released, animation director Art Davis parodied the film's title with a
Merrie Melodies cartoon called Two Gophers from Texas, starring Mac & Tosh, better known as The Goofy Gophers. The title was spoofed yet again for Freleng's 1956 cartoon Two Crows from Tacos.

Reception
The film earned $2,350,000 in rentals in the US according to Variety.

According to Warner Bros records, the film earned $2,566,000 domestically and $397,000 foreign.

See also
 List of American films of 1948

References

External links
 
 
 
 

1948 films
1948 musical comedy films
1940s Western (genre) comedy films
American musical comedy films
Bugs Bunny films
Films directed by David Butler
Films shot in California
Films scored by Ray Heindorf 
Films set in Texas
Films with screenplays by I. A. L. Diamond
Warner Bros. films
1940s English-language films
1940s American films